Azurocidin also known as cationic antimicrobial protein CAP37 or heparin-binding protein (HBP) is a protein that in humans is encoded by the AZU1 gene.

Function 

Azurophil granules, specialized lysosomes of the neutrophil, contain at least 10 proteins implicated in the killing of microorganisms. The protein encoded by this gene is an azurophil granule antimicrobial protein, with monocyte chemotactic and antibacterial activity. It is also an important multifunctional inflammatory mediator. The genes encoding this protein, neutrophil elastase 2, and proteinase 3 are in a cluster located at chromosome 19pter. All 3 genes are expressed coordinately and their protein products are packaged together into azurophil granules during neutrophil differentiation.

Structure 

This encoded protein is a member of the PA clan of proteases but it is not a serine proteinase, because the active site serine and histidine residues are replaced, making it a pseudoenzyme.

Clinical significance 

In patients with fever, high plasma levels of HBP indicates that the patient is at high risk of developing sepsis with circulatory collapse.

References

External links

Further reading